Eretis mitiana is a species of butterfly in the family Hesperiidae. It is found in Uganda, western Kenya and western Tanzania. The habitat consists of highland forests.

References

Butterflies described in 1937
Celaenorrhinini